The 2002 Omloop Het Volk was the 56th edition of the Omloop Het Volk cycle race and was held on 2 March 2002. The race started in Ghent and finished in Lokeren. The race was won by Peter Van Petegem.

General classification

References

2002
Omloop Het Nieuwsblad
Omloop Het Nieuwsblad
March 2002 sports events in Europe